IBJ  may refer to:
Insulated block joint: rail joint incorporating insulation to isolate individual track circuits
The Industrial Bank of Japan, Ltd: Japanese bank, one of the predecessors to Mizuho Financial Group
Indianapolis Business Journal: a business publication in Indianapolis, Indiana
International Bridges to Justice is a non-profit, non-governmental organization dedicated to protecting the basic legal rights of ordinary citizens in developing countries.
International Brotherhood of Jones, the collective fan base of The Glen Jones Radio Programme Featuring X.Ray Burns on noted freeform radio station WFMU.